Astraea is a Greek goddess. Astraea may also refer to:

 Astraea (gastropod), a genus of sea snails
 Astraea (plant), a genus of plants in the family Euphorbiaceae
 5 Astraea, asteroid
 a synonym for Croton (plant), a gymnosperm plant genus of Rushfoil
 , a name for warships reused by the Royal Navy
 , a Royal Navy ship class 
 Astraia, the ancient Greek name of the city of Radoviš in modern North Macedonia
 ASTRAEA (aerospace), UK UAV programme
 Astraea (album), album by Rolo Tomassi, 2012
 Astraea Lesbian Foundation for Justice, an LGBT foundation based in the United States

See also
 Astrea (disambiguation)